Jüdischer Friedhof Köln-Mülheim is a Jewish cemetery in the former city of Mülheim am Rhein, which since 1914 has been incorporated into the district of Cologne, Germany. The cemetery was built in 1774.

References

External links
 

Mulheim
Mulheim